Guillermo Castro may refer to:
Guillermo Castro (soldier) (1810-?), Mexican soldier and magistrate
Guillermo Castro (Salvadoran footballer) (born 1940), Salvadoran footballer
Guillermo Castro (Spanish footballer) (born 1973), Spanish footballer